Farneta is a frazione of the comune of Montefiorino, Italy, located in the Apennines of the province of Modena.

Located between the two hamlets of Gusciola (c. 2 km distant) and  Romanoro (c. 7 km), the town in subdivided in four divisions: I Boschi, Il Monte, Il Castello and La Chiesa that since  the Middle Ages battle themselves in the so-called "district games".

References

External links
  Farneta official website 

Cities and towns in Emilia-Romagna